Dirk Wilutzky (born 1965 in Herleshausen, West Germany) is a German film producer and director.  He won the shared Academy Award for Best Documentary Feature for the 2014 documentary Citizenfour at the 87th Academy Awards in 2015.  He is married to film editor Mathilde Bonnefoy,  with whom he produced Citizenfour.

Filmography (selected)

Director 
 2005: The Fleetingness
 2007: Pitching in Hollywood
 2011: Was tun?

Producer 
 2009: Germany 09: 13 Short Films About the State of the Nation
 2010: Soul Boy
 2011: Und wir sind nicht die Einzigen
 2014: Citizenfour

Production management 
 1998: Wolffs Revier (TV series)
 1998: Der Clown (TV series)
 2002: Bowling for Columbine
 2003: The Soul of a Man

References

External links 
 
 

Living people
Mass media people from Hesse
German documentary filmmakers
1965 births
Directors of Best Documentary Feature Academy Award winners
People from Werra-Meißner-Kreis